Television in Ecuador is most important among the country's mass media. Television programming is dominated by telenovelas, series, and news programming. Private and government-run channels coexist at the national, regional, and local levels. Cable channels are also beginning to appear, most of which are exclusive to the companies that operate them. Finally, there are also internet television channels, some of which have specific themes like LGBT programming.

There are six private channels (Ecuavisa, Teleamazonas, RTS, Telerama, RTU, Radio y Televisión Unidas, Latele and Oromar Televisión) and four government-run channels (TC Televisión, Gama TV, Canal Uno and Ecuador TV) available throughout the country. In 2011, 83% of channels were privately owned, 17% were publicly owned, and 0% were community owned.

Most viewed channels

Channels
Quito TV

References